Chlorsulfuron is an ALS (acetolactate synthase) inhibitor herbicide, and is a sulfonylurea compound. It was discovered by George Levitt in February 1976 while working at DuPont, which was the patent assignee.

Brand names
Originally introduced in 1982 under the brand name Glean by DuPont, later also as Telar, in North America.

Chemistry
The first synthesis of chlorsulfuron was disclosed in a patent filed by DuPont in 1977. 2-Chlorobenzenesulfonyl isocyanate was condensed with 2-amino-4-methoxy-6-methyl-1,3,5-triazine to form the sulfonylurea product.

Mode of action
Chlorsulfuron is an herbicide of the acetolactate synthase inhibitor (ALS inhibitor) class, HRAC (Herbicide Resistance Action Committee) group 2 (legacy HRAC Group B).

Efficacy
Triticum aestivum is naturally resistant via aryl hydroxylation then conjugation with glucose compounds into non-herbicidal conjugates. Widespread weed resistance to chlorsulfuron has been found across North America and around the world. T. aestivums close relative Lolium rigidum was found to be using the same mechanism by Christopher et al 1991 and Cotterman & Saari 1992. A North American population of Stellaria media was found by Hall and Devine 1990 to be resistant by way of an ALS target mutation rather than by improved disposal. Increased P450 activity can also be effective, such as in Alopecurus myosuroides (found by Letouzé and Gasquez 2003), and L. rigidum (by Tardif and Powles 1999). Another such mechanism - the acetolactate synthase target-site mutation Pro-197–Ser - was found by Roux et al 2004 to be accompanied by a 37% recessive fitness cost in a model (Arabidopsis thaliana).

Use in genetic engineering
Genes conveying resistance to chlorsulfuron are used as selectable markers when attempting transformation with other genes, for example in Dianthus caryophyllus and Marchantia polymorpha.

Crops have also been deliberately made resistant, for example in maize/corn by McCabe et al 1988 using bombardment with the relevant gene attached to tungsten particles.

Applications

Chlorsulfuron has a broad spectrum of activity on commercially important broadleaf weeds and grasses but at the recommended use rate it is safe to important crops such as wheat. Its properties mean that it can be applied to soil so emerging weeds take it up and are controlled. Alternatively, spraying after weeds are already present in the crop will also lead to control. The compound is used mainly in wheat but also in pasture.

Chlorsulfuron is recommended alone or with aminocyclopyrachlor for control of Centaurea solstitialis, Centaurea calcitrapa, and Centaurea iberica in the Pacific Northwest of North America.

References

Sulfonylureas
Sulfonylurea herbicides
Chloroarenes
Triazines
Methoxy compounds